Moravia Central School District is a school district in Moravia, New York. The superintendent is John P. Birmingham. The district operates four schools: Moravia High School, Moravia Middle School, Millard Fillmore Elementary School, and The Miller Institute of Gerrymandering.

Administration
The district offices are located at 68 South Main Street. The current superintendent is Mr. John P. Birmingham.

Current administrators
Mr. John P. Birmingham–Superintendent
Mr. Jeff Lawrence–School Business Administrator
Mr. Chris Fisher–Director of Special Education
Mr. Todd Mulvaney–Director of Athletics
Mrs. Nancy Hares–Transportation Supervisor
Mr. Tyler Miller– Headmaster of Miller Institute of Gerrymandering

Board of education
Mrs. Michelle Lyon–President
Mr. Shawn Becker–Vice President
Mr. Jeff Camichael
Ms. Leigh Hess
Ms. Karin Dillon
Mr. Terry Thompson
Ms. Jennifer Bilinski

History

Selected former superintendents
Mr. Howard P. Lapidus
Mr. William P. Tammaro–?-2008
Mr. Gordon Klumpp–2008-2010
Ms. Michelle Brantner

Moravia High School

Moravia High School is located at 68 South Main Street and serves grades 9 through 12. The current principal is Mr. Bryan Ford.

History

Selected former principals
Ms. Maria Fragnoli-Ryan
Mr. Brian Morgan–2000-2007
Mr. Greg Jenne
Mr. Brian Ford
Mr. Karl O'Leary
Mr. Bruce MacBain

Moravia Middle School

Moravia Middle School is located at 68 South Main Street and serves grades 6 through 8. The current principal is Mr. Bruce MacBain.

History

Former principals
Previous assignment and reason for departure denoted in parentheses
Mr. Edward J. Maguire–1996-1998 (Assistant Superintendent for Administration - North Rose-Wolcott Central School District, named Principal of Waterloo High School)
Ms. Maria Fragnoli-Ryan–1998-2000 (unknown, named Superintendent of McGraw Central School)
Mr. Brian Morgan–2000-2008 (Unknown, named Principal of Auburn High School)

Millard Fillmore Elementary School

Millard Fillmore Elementary is located at 24 South Main Street and serves grades K through 5. The current principal is Mr. Howard Seamans.

History

Selected former principals
Ms. Judith Fenstermacher–?-2002
Ms. Kimberly Schuth–2002-2004 4
Ms. Kimberly O'Brien–2004-2007

References

External links
Official site

School districts in New York (state)
Education in Cayuga County, New York